Bibi Lindström (1904–1984) was a Swedish art director. She designed the sets for more than a hundred film productions.

Selected filmography

 Jolly Musicians (1932)
 The Dangerous Game (1933)
 Saturday Nights (1933)
 The Women Around Larsson (1934)
 Shipwrecked Max (1936)
 The Quartet That Split Up (1936)
 Raggen (1936)
 Our Boy (1936)
 Sun Over Sweden (1938)
 Hanna in Society (1940)
 Her Melody (1940)
 The Poor Millionaire (1941)
 Woman on Board (1941)
 We House Slaves (1942)
 Men of the Navy (1943)
 Imprisoned Women (1943)
 I Killed (1943)
 Life and Death (1943)
 Prince Gustaf (1944)
 I Am Fire and Air (1944)
 The Rose of Tistelön (1945)
 Interlude (1946)
 Maria (1947)
 Neglected by His Wife (1947)
 The Poetry of Ådalen (1947)
 The People of Simlang Valley (1947)
 On These Shoulders (1948)
 Carnival Evening (1948)
 Realm of Man (1949)
 The Girl from the Third Row (1949)
 Jack of Hearts (1950)
 The White Cat (1950)
 Teacher's First Born (1950)
 Knockout at the Breakfast Club (1950)
 Andersson's Kalle (1950)
 Miss Julie (1951)
 My Name Is Puck (1951)
 One Summer of Happiness (1951)
 The Clang of the Pick (1952)
 The Green Lift (1952)
 Unmarried Mothers (1953)
 Ursula, the Girl from the Finnish Forests (1953)
 The Shadow (1953)
 The Road to Klockrike (1953)
 The Beat of Wings in the Night (1953)
 Salka Valka (1954)
 Enchanted Walk (1954)
 Young Summer (1954)
 The People of Hemsö (1955)
 Men in the Dark (1955)
 The Summer Wind Blows (1955)
 The Dance Hall (1955)
 A Little Nest (1956)
 The Minister of Uddarbo (1957)
 No Tomorrow (1957)
 Mannequin in Red (1958)
 Fridolf Stands Up! (1958)
 We at Väddö (1958)
 The Lady in Black (1958)
 Rider in Blue (1959)
 The Beloved Game (1959)
 The Wedding Day (1960)
 Summer and Sinners (1960)
 Good Friends and Faithful Neighbours (1960)
 Siska (1962)
 The Dress (1964)

References

Bibliography
 Vermilye, Jerry. Ingmar Bergman: His Life and Films. McFarland, 2002.

External links

1904 births
1984 deaths
Swedish art directors